Karl Ellis (1888 – 1 December 1924 Tallinn) was an Estonian politician. He was a member of I Riigikogu, representing the Estonian Independent Socialist Workers' Party. He was a member of the assembly since 16 December 1921. He replaced Aksel Brehm. On 10 March 1922, he resigned his position and he was replaced by Paula Järv.

References

1888 births
1924 deaths
Estonian Independent Socialist Workers' Party politicians
Members of the Riigikogu, 1920–1923